Shahbaz Tariq (born 24 December 1948 in Pakistan) is a Norwegian politician for the Labour Party.

He served as a deputy representative to the Norwegian Parliament from Oslo during the terms 1989–1993, 1993–1997, 1997–2001 and 2001–2005. From 2000 to 2001 he was a regular representative, covering for Bjørn Tore Godal who was appointed to the first cabinet Stoltenberg.

Tariq was a member of Oslo city council from 1991 to 2003.

See also
 Norwegians of Pakistani descent

References

1948 births
Living people
Members of the Storting
Labour Party (Norway) politicians
Pakistani emigrants to Norway
21st-century Norwegian politicians
20th-century Norwegian politicians